The Disfranchising Act was an Act of Parliament of the Parliament of Ireland debated in 1727 and enacted in 1728, one of a series of Penal Laws, and prohibited all Roman Catholics from voting in parliamentary elections. Its full title is "An Act for the further regulating the Election of Members of Parliament, and preventing the irregular Proceedings of Sheriffs and other Officers in electing and returning such Members" and its citation is 1 Geo II c.9. It received royal assent on 6 May 1728.

In the eighteenth century, elections were held at irregular intervals and at the beginning of a new reign. The Act followed the death of George I on 11 June 1727 but did not take effect until after the election of 1727, coming into force in 1728.

The Act was repealed by the Roman Catholic Relief Act 1793, allowing the franchise in Ireland to all men holding a property with a rental value of at least two pounds annually.

See also
Religion in the United Kingdom

References

External links
Text of Act

Acts of the Parliament of Ireland (pre-1801)
1727 in law
1727 in Ireland
Religion and politics
Penal Laws in Ireland
Repealed Irish legislation
1727 in Christianity
Election legislation